Habib ur Rahman was a Pakistani politician hailing from Kalpani, Gagra, District Buner who served as minister of Zakat & Usher, Auqaf, Hajj & Religious Affairs in the Khyber Pakhtunkhwa Assembly from 2013 to 2018. 

Rahman died from COVID-19 in 2021.

External links

References

1948 births
2021 deaths
Pashtun people
Khyber Pakhtunkhwa MPAs 2013–2018
People from Buner District
Jamaat-e-Islami Pakistan politicians
Deaths from the COVID-19 pandemic in Pakistan